Caviglia is an Italian surname. Notable people with the surname include:

 Giovanni Battista Caviglia (1770–1845), Italian navigator and Egyptologist
 Enrico Caviglia (1862–1945), Italian General
 Orestes Caviglia (1893–1971), Argentine actor and film director

Italian-language surnames
it:Caviglia